Fritz Kienzl (born 1924) was an Austrian luger who competed during the 1950s. He won a gold medal in the men's singles event at the 1954 European luge championships in Davos, Switzerland. His wife Karla Kienzl won silver at this event.

References
List of European luge champions 

1924 births
Possibly living people
Austrian male lugers